Aleksandar Stefanov Shalamanov (4 September 1941– 25 October 2021) was a football player and professional alpine skier and is known as the only Bulgarian who has participated in the Winter Olympics (as alpine skier in 1960) and in the FIFA World Cup. The Summer Olympics saw him as reserve player of the volleyball team in 1964, but he did not play in a match.

Shalamanov began his career as a defender with CSKA Sofia in 1960–61, but moved to Slavia Sofia in 1961 to remain there until 1974, when he retired after 263 matches in the Bulgarian Championship, three Bulgarian Cup trophies (1963, 1964 and 1966) and a Cup Winners' Cup semi-final in 1967. Shalamanov has twice been selected Best Bulgarian Footballer, in 1963 and 1966, and twice Best Bulgarian Sportsman, in 1967 and 1973. He has 42 caps for the Bulgaria national team, with which he participated in the World Cup 1966 and World Cup 1970.

On 26 October 2021, a day after his death, the team announced that the stadium would be renamed in his honor to Aleksandar Shalamanov Stadium.

Personal life
He was the father of the Alpine skier Stefan Shalamanov.

References

External links

1941 births
2021 deaths
Bulgarian footballers
Bulgarian male alpine skiers
Bulgarian men's volleyball players
Olympic alpine skiers of Bulgaria
Alpine skiers at the 1960 Winter Olympics
PFC CSKA Sofia players
1966 FIFA World Cup players
1970 FIFA World Cup players
Bulgaria international footballers
PFC Slavia Sofia players
First Professional Football League (Bulgaria) players
Association football defenders
Sportspeople from Sofia